The Battle of the Blue is an annual college football rivalry game between the University of Delaware Fightin' Blue Hens and Villanova University Wildcats. The first game was played between the two teams in 1895, was played annually from 1964 to 1980 when Villanova dropped football, and then resumed with the re-emergence of Villanova football having been played annually since 1988. Beginning in 2007, the annual Delaware–Villanova game became known as Battle of the Blue. As part of this concept, the winning team gets to keep the Battle of the Blue Trophy at its institution for the year and is responsible for bringing the trophy to the following installment of the rivalry game. The trophy consists of a football with a Villanova logo and the Wildcat shade of blue on one side and the Blue Hen logo and the Delaware shade of blue on the other side. The ball sits in a wooden platform and the scores of each game are engraved on the base of the trophy. Villanova had possession of the trophy for the first four years, until Delaware won in 2011.

Three times within the first four years of the rivalry's existence, one of the teams went on to reach the NCAA Division I Football Championship. In 2007, the Wildcats upset #9 Delaware 19–14 to claim the first Battle of the Blue Trophy. Delaware would later reach the FCS National Championship game before falling to the Appalachian State Mountaineers 49–21. In 2009, Villanova would win their first-ever appearance in the national championship, defeating the Montana Grizzlies 23–21. The 2010 meeting marked the first time the game had gone into overtime, with the Wildcats securing another upset win over the #1-ranked Delaware team on a recovered fumble. Once again, however, Delaware would reach the national championship, but would lose to Eastern Washington, 20–19.

In 2011, the Battle of the Blue was the first American football game to be played at the venue now known as Subaru Park in Chester, Pennsylvania, in which Delaware beat Villanova to earn the trophy for the first time. 

The 2020 season’s Battle of the Blue game, played in spring 2021 as with many other FCS regular-season games due to the COVID-19 pandemic, ended in controversy when victorious Delaware players mockingly danced on the Villanova “V” midfield logo as the final seconds ticked away, inciting a skirmish requiring coaches of both teams restraining student-athletes.

Game results

See also
 List of NCAA college football rivalry games

References

College football rivalries in the United States
Delaware Fightin' Blue Hens football
Villanova Wildcats football
Recurring sporting events established in 2007